Alpamare is a water park in Scarborough, England.

History 
Planning permission for the park was granted in 2012 as part of a development called The Sands located in Scarborough's North Bay. In July 2016 it was announced that the park would be opening on 28 July, however, the opening was delayed. It instead opened on 30 July 2016. A spa opened in 2019.

Facilities 
The park contains four slides, an indoor wave pool, two outdoor pools, a restaurant and bar, and a spa.

References 

Buildings and structures in Scarborough, North Yorkshire
2016 establishments in England
Water parks in the United Kingdom